Kyle Featherstone (born June 27, 1991), known professionally as Feather, is an American electronic dance music producer.

Early life 
Kyle Featherstone was born in Minneapolis, Minnesota and grew up in Hudson, Wisconsin. Growing up he always loved music and when he was in 3rd grade he started playing the piano. He began singing in his high school choir after auditioning for the musical at his school. After graduating from Hudson High School, he moved to Madison, Wisconsin where he went to the University of Wisconsin Madison. Featherstone began playing in bands inspired by Coldplay, Jack's Mannequin, and Augustana when he was a sophomore in college. In 2016 left his touring band & moved back to Minneapolis, where he started working on producing electronic music.

Career 
Featherstone started releasing remixes while working on his own original music. In June 2018, he released his first remix for Lauv's song "I Like Me Better" through the YouTube channel Proximity. Ben Allen of ElectroJams reviewed the track saying "In a style reminiscent of an Odesza/Autograf lovechild, Feather infuses the year-old Lauv track with a wash of synths, accented by beefed-up percussion, culminating in cinematic builds and drops".

He released a remix for Timeflies song "Little Bit" on August 10, 2018. One week later, a remix of Loote's song "Wish I Never Met You" was released through Island Records. In 2019, Featherstone remixed Trove's "GTFO", which was released through disco:wax records.

Featherstone released the debut single of his original music, "Safe House", on October 28, 2020. He released his follow up single "Smoke" on December 9, 2020, which was a collaboration with artist Lostboycrow.

He released his debut EP "Becoming" on January 13, 2020. Dancing Astronaut reviewed the EP saying "Becoming is a well-rounded body of work that wholly substantiates Feather’s production dexterity".

On March 5, 2020, Don Diablo, John K, and JLV released the song "Problems", which was written by Featherstone.

He uses Bitwig Studio, Logic Pro, and Ableton to produce his music.

Discography

Releases

Remixes

References

1991 births
Living people
American electronic musicians
Record producers from Minnesota
Record producers from Wisconsin
Electro house musicians
Progressive house musicians
Electropop musicians
Future bass musicians
University of Wisconsin–Madison alumni